The Flag of Yucatán was the flag used by the former Republic of Yucatán, when in the middle of 19th century it was proclaimed in the territory of the Yucatán Peninsula.  The republic comprised the present Mexican states of Yucatán, Campeche and Quintana Roo.

History

The flag was first flown on March 16, 1841 when it was hoisted on the Ayuntamiento municipal building in the "Plaza Grande" of Mérida, the capital city of the state of Yucatán. This action was a protest against the centralism of Mexican president Antonio López de Santa Anna. The flag was never officially used again by the authorities of Yucatan.

Specifications
Regarding the historical flag of the Republic of Yucatán, the historian Rodolfo Menéndez de la Peña describes the flag thus

Modern usage
Although never formally recognized, the flag was used throughout the 20th century at ceremonies and festivals of various kinds. The flag's use increased after 2000, after tensions between then governor Víctor Cervera Pacheco and the federal government, and spread rapidly being carried in cars, shirts, posters, etc., as a manifestation of local feeling against the federal government.

Currently, the people from Yucatán use it to express their yucataneidad (pride of being Yucatecan). In 2001, a commemoration for the 160th anniversary of its first and last official use was held in the city of Mérida . In 2010, the flag reappeared at a sports event where then governor Ivonne Ortega Pacheco explained to visiting boxing promoter Don King the meaning of the flag.

See also
 Coat of arms of Mexico
 Territorial evolution of Mexico
 Political divisions of Mexico
 List of Mexican flags

References

Yucatan
Republic of Yucatán
Obsolete national flags